
Otto-Wilhelm Förster (16 March 1885  – 24 June 1966) was a general in the  German Army  during World War II who commanded several corps. He was a recipient of the Knight's Cross of the Iron Cross. Förster retired from active duty in January 1944. He was arrested by the Soviet authorities following the war. Convicted as a war criminal in Soviet Union, he was held until 1955.

Awards and decorations

 Knight's Cross of the Iron Cross on  28 April 1943 as Generalleutnant and commander of 93. Infanterie-Division

References

Citations

Bibliography

 

1885 births
1966 deaths
People from Ilmenau
Major generals of the Reichswehr
German Army personnel of World War I
Recipients of the Knight's Cross of the Iron Cross
German prisoners of war in World War II held by the Soviet Union
People from Saxe-Weimar-Eisenach
Siegfried Line
Recipients of the clasp to the Iron Cross, 1st class
German Army generals of World War II
Generals of Engineers
Military personnel from Thuringia